William Henry Thomas (1920–2009) was a delegate in the Maryland House of Delegates representing District 35, which covered Dorchester, Talbot, and Wicomico Counties.

Background

Delegate Thomas attended the Dorchester County public schools. He later served in U.S. Air Force during World War II.  In March 1943 he was commissioned as a 2nd lieutenant. As a pilot, he flew more than 47 missions and was awarded the Distinguished Flying Cross. 

He was a County Commissioner of Dorchester County, Maryland from 1970 to 197474. He was the Director of the Dorchester General Hospital from 1970 to 1971. He was a member of the Farm Bureau; American Legion; VFW.  President of the Cambridge Rotary Club, 1974; Commodore of the Cambridge Yacht Club, 1969 and a board member, Grace Methodist Church.

References

County commissioners in Maryland
People from Harford County, Maryland
1920 births
2009 deaths
Members of the Maryland House of Delegates
People from Dorchester County, Maryland
20th-century American politicians
United States Army Air Forces personnel of World War II